1988 hurricane season may refer to: 

 1988 Atlantic hurricane season
 1988 Pacific hurricane season